Omoglymmius ferrugatus is a species of beetle in the subfamily Rhysodinae. It was described by R.T. Bell & J.R. Bell in 1988. It is known from Potil Kecil in Banggai Archipelago, east of Sulawesi (Indonesia).

Omoglymmius ferrugatus holotype, a male, measures  in length and was collected under bark of a fallen tree.

Notes

References

ferrugatus
Beetles of Indonesia
Endemic fauna of Indonesia
Beetles described in 1988